Biache-Saint-Vaast is a commune in the Pas-de-Calais department in the Hauts-de-France region in northern France.

Geography
A small farming and light industrial town located 8 miles (13 km) east of Arras, on the banks of the Scarpe river, at the junction of the D42, D43 and D46  roads. The A26 autoroute passes by just yards from the commune. Biache-Saint-Vaast station has rail connections to Arras and Douai.

Population

Sights
 The church of St. Pierre, rebuilt, as was much of the town, after the ravages of World War I.
 The war memorials.
 An archaeological site of a Stone Age settlement of the Mousterian culture, with finds showing signs of the Levallois technique.

Personalities
 Charles Delestraint, general and member of the French Resistance

See also
Communes of the Pas-de-Calais department

References

External links

 Vivre Mieux à Biache
 The CWGC graves at Biache-Saint-Vaast

Communes of Pas-de-Calais
Neanderthal sites